Grutter is a surname. Notable people with the surname include:

Alfred Grütter (1860—1937), Swiss sports shooter
Peter Grütter (born 1942), Swiss figure skater and figure skating coach
Virginia Grutter (1929–2000), Costa Rican writer, actress and theatre director

See also
Grutter v. Bollinger, a 2003 United States Supreme Court case